The Palazzo Garzoni is Gothic-style palace located on the Grand Canal, in the Sestieri of San Marco, adjacent to the Fondaco Marcello, in Venice, Italy.

History
The palace was erected in the 15th century. The aristocrat Pietro Garzoni had a famous library.

References

Garzoni
Garzoni
Gothic architecture in Venice